The IBM 2922 Programmable Terminal is a Remote Job Entry (RJE) terminal introduced by IBM in 1972.  The 2922 communicated using Binary Synchronous Communications (Bisync).

The 2922 and associated peripherals were RPQs, that is special-order equipment not on the standard price list.  The system was a repackaging of an IBM System/360 Model 20 and peripherals for use as a dedicated terminal.

Standard components
The 2922-1 Terminal Control Unit (RPQ 810563) employed the same instruction set architecture as the Model 20.  It incorporated 8,192 bytes of 3.6 μs magnetic-core memory. The control unit also contained the Binary Synchronous Communications Adapter (BSCA) integrated into the Terminal Control Unit that supported a single line at speeds up to 7200 bits per second (bps).

The 2922-2 Terminal Printer (RPQ 810564) was a repackaged 1403 printer.  The printer used a print chain and provided a page width of 132 characters using fanfold paper.  The controls and indicators for the printer were located on the front panel of the Terminal Control Unit, except for a duplicate start key on the rear of the printer.

The 2922-3 Terminal Card Reader (RPQ 810565) was a repackaged 2501, an optical punched card reader for 80-column cards with a rated speed of 500 cards per minute.  The controls and indicators for the card reader were located on the front panel of the Terminal Control Unit.

Optional components
One IBM 2152 printer/keyboard could be attached to an adapter in the Terminal Control Unit.  This device had a selectric print mechanism and resembled the 1052 printer/keyboard used as a console on many System/360 computers.  It operated at 15.5 characters per second (CPS).

One IBM 1442 Model 5 card punch could be attached to an adapter in the Terminal Control Unit.  The 1442 could punch 80-column cards at a rate of 91 cards per minute (cpm) if all 80 columns were punched.

Software
The 2922 had no disk, however magnetic core had the property of retaining programs loaded from cards thru power on-off cycles.

IBM supplied a remote job entry program for the 2922 as Type 2 Field Developed Program (FDP).

DOS/VS POWER Workstation Support for the IBM 2922 (FDP 5198-BBY) handled communication with a DOS/VS system using POWER software for remote job entry.

Users
In 1974 Computerworld reported that the State of Mississippi was using six 2922 terminals to communicate with a central System/370 Model 145.

References

2922
Remote job entry